is a Japanese kickboxer. He is the former RISE Super Featherweight champion and the 2018 K-1 Super Featherweight GP finalist.

He was ranked as a top ten bantamweight kickboxer by Combat Press between April 2018 and July 2021.

Kickboxing career

RISE

RISE Super Featherweight title reign
Komiyama made his professional debut in December 2007, against Daisuke Honma. He won the figh by decision. Komiyama would go on to win his next three fights, before fighting Masato Fuse for the RISE Rookies Cup at R.I.S.E 49. He beat Fuse by TKO, managing to knock him down three times in the second round.

Komiyama amassed a 7-2 record over his next nine fights, before challenging Kan Itabashi for the RISE Super Featherweight title at RISE 74. He won the fight by split decision.

His next four fights were non-title bouts. At RISE 80 he fought Hamza Essalih, whom he defeated by majority decision. At RISE 83 he beat Kim Jin Hyeok by unanimous decision, at RISE 85 he beat Sergio Wielzen by a first round knockout, and at RISE 87 he beat Mu Yuenlong by a first round TKO.

He was scheduled to defend his title for the first time at RISE 88, when he faced Motochika Hanada. He beat Hanada by TKO, after Hanada's corner threw in the towel in the fourth round. Following his successful title defense, Komiyama extended his winning streak to 12, which culminated in a majority decision over Yuki. The streak was snapped by Itto at RISE 95, who defeated Komiyama by unanimous decision.

Komiyama was scheduled to defend his title for the second time at RISE 97, against Masanobu Goshu, whom he beat by majority decision.

BLADE FC tournament
AFter back to back losses to Maki Pinsiam and Kaew Fairtex, Komiyama entered the 2014 BLADE FC 61kg tournament. In the quarterfinals, he fought Yasuyuki, and won the fight by unanimous decision. He won the semifinal bout against Katsuji in same fashion. Komiyama fought SHIGERU in the tournament final, and stopped his opponent by knockout in the second round.

For his last fight with RISE, Komiyama was scheduled to fight Mansour Yaqubi at RISE 109. The fight ended in a draw after three rounds, and so went into an extra round, after which Komiyama won by unanimous decision.

K-1
In his promotional debut, Komiyama faced Yun Qi. Qi won the fight by majority decision.

Komiyama participated in the 2016 K-1 Super Featherweight Grand Prix. He defeated Paulo Tebar by unanimous decision in the quarterfinal, but was unable to advance to the semifinals, as he had to be taken to the hospital due to a leg injury he had sustained during the bout. He fought again two months later, defeating Stavros Exakoustidis by unanimous decision.

Komiyama took part in the 2018 K-1 Super Featherweight Grand Prix, being scheduled to fight Suarek Rukkukamui in the quarterfinal. He knocked Suarek out in the first round by a head kick. In the semifinal, he beat Koji by unanimous decision, and faced Takeru Segawa in the finals. Takeru won the fight by TKO, knocking Komiyama down three times in the third round.

In his next two fights, Komiyama defeated Masanobu Goshu by unanimous decision, and suffered a knockout loss to Leona Pettas.

Titles and accomplishments
K-1
 2018 K-1 WORLD GP -60kg World Tournament runner-up

RISE
 2011 RISE Super Featherweight Champion (Defended twice)
 2014 BLADE FC -61kg Japan Cup Champion
Awards
eFight.jp
Fighter of the Month (December 2014)

Professional kickboxing record

|-  style="text-align:center; background:#Fbb;"
| 2019-06-30|| Loss ||align=left| Leona Pettas || K-1 World GP 2019: Super Bantamweight World Tournament || Saitama, Japan || KO (Left Jab) || 2 || 

|- align="center"  bgcolor="#CCFFCC"
| 2019-03-10 || Win || align=left| Masanobu Goshu || K-1 World GP 2019: K’FESTA 2 || Saitama, Japan  || Decision (Unanimous) || 3 || 3:00

|- align="center"  bgcolor="#FFBBBB"
| 2018-03-21 || Loss || align=left| Takeru || K-1 World GP 2018: K'FESTA.1 -60kg World Tournament, Final || Saitama, Japan || TKO (3 Knockdowns/Right Hook) || 3 || 2:01
|-
! style=background:white colspan=9 |

|-  style="text-align:center; background:#CCFFCC;"
| 2018-03-21|| Win ||align=left| Koji || K-1 World GP 2018: K'FESTA.1 -60kg World Tournament Semi Finals || Saitama, Japan || Decision (Unanimous) || 3 || 3:00

|- align="center"  bgcolor="#CCFFCC"
| 2018-03-21 || Win || align=left| Suarek Rukkukamui || K-1 World GP 2018: K'FESTA.1 -60kg World Tournament, Quarter Finals || Saitama, Japan || KO (left high kick) || 1 || 2:56

|-  style="text-align:center; background:#cfc;"
| 2017-11-23|| Win || align=left| Stavros Exakoustidis || K-1 World GP 2017 Heavyweight Championship Tournament|| Japan || Decision (Unanimous) || 3 || 3:00

|-  style="text-align:center; background:#cfc;"
| 2016-09-19 || Win ||align=left| Paulo Tebar || K-1 World GP 2016 -60kg World Tournament Quarter Finals || Tokyo, Japan ||Decision (Unanimous) || 3 || 3:00
|-
! style=background:white colspan=9 |

|-  style="text-align:center; background:#Fbb;"
| 2016-06-24 || Loss || align=left| Yun Qi || K-1 World GP 2016 -65kg World Tournament || Tokyo, Japan || Decision (Majority) || 3 || 3:00

|-  style="text-align:center; background:#cfc;"
| 2016-01-31 || Win || align=left| Mansour Yaqubi || RISE 109 || Tokyo, Japan || Ext.R Decision (Unanimous) || 4 || 3:00

|-  style="text-align:center; background:#cfc;"
| 2014-12-29 || Win || align=left| SHIGERU || BLADE FIGHTING CHAMPIONSHIP 1 - JAPAN CUP -61kg, Final || Tokyo, Japan || TKO (Left Hook)|| 2 || 0:17
|-
! style=background:white colspan=9 |

|-  style="text-align:center; background:#cfc;"
| 2014-12-29 || Win || align=left| Katsuji || BLADE FIGHTING CHAMPIONSHIP 1 - JAPAN CUP -61kg, Semi Finals || Tokyo, Japan || Decision (Unanimous)|| 3 || 3:00

|-  style="text-align:center; background:#cfc;"
| 2014-12-29 || Win || align=left| Yasuyuki || BLADE FIGHTING CHAMPIONSHIP 1 - JAPAN CUP -61kg, Quarter Finals || Tokyo, Japan || Decision (Unanimous)|| 3 || 3:00

|- align="center"  bgcolor="#FFBBBB"
| 2014-07-12 || Loss || align=left| Kaew Fairtex || RISE 100 -Blade 0- || Tokyo, Japan || Decision (Unanimous) || 3 || 3:00

|- align="center"  bgcolor="#FFBBBB"
| 2014-04-13 || Loss || align=left| Pinsiam Maki || MAJKF DRAGON.5 ～THE ONE AND ONLY～ Monkoukaihou || Tokyo, Japan || Decision (Majority) || 3 || 3:00

|-  style="text-align:center; background:#cfc;"
| 2014-01-25 || Win || align=left| Masanobu Goshu || RISE 97 || Tokyo, Japan || Decision (Majority)|| 5 || 3:00
|-
! style=background:white colspan=9 |

|- align="center"  bgcolor="#FFBBBB"
| 2013-09-13 || Loss || align=left| Itto || RISE 95 || Tokyo, Japan || Decision (Unanimous) || 3 || 3:00

|-  style="text-align:center; background:#cfc;"
| 2013-06-09 || Win || align=left| Yuki || RISE 93 || Tokyo, Japan || Decision (Majority)|| 3 || 3:00

|-  style="text-align:center; background:#cfc;"
| 2013-04-20 || Win || align=left| Kim Sung Jae || SHOOT BOXING 2013 || Tokyo, Japan || Decision (Unanimous)|| 3 || 3:00

|-  style="text-align:center; background:#cfc;"
| 2012-11-17 || Win || align=left| Naguranchun Masa M16 || SHOOT BOXING World Tournament S-cup 2012 || Tokyo, Japan || Ext.R Decision (Majority) || 4 || 3:00

|-  style="text-align:center; background:#cfc;"
| 2012-09-17 || Win || align=left| Akifumi Utagawa || SHOOT BOXING 2012 Road to S-cup～act.4 || Tokyo, Japan || Decision (Unanimous)|| 3 || 3:00

|-  style="text-align:center; background:#cfc;"
| 2012-06-02 || Win || align=left| Motochika Hanada || RISE 88 || Tokyo, Japan || TKO (Corner Stoppage)|| 4 || 2:53
|-
! style=background:white colspan=9 |

|-  style="text-align:center; background:#cfc;"
| 2012-03-24 || Win || align=left| Mu Yuenlong || RISE 87 || Tokyo, Japan || TKO (Punches) || 1 || 1:12

|-  style="text-align:center; background:#cfc;"
| 2011-11-23 || Win || align=left| Sergio Wielzen || RISE 85 || Tokyo, Japan || KO (Front Kick to the face) || 1 || 2:08

|-  style="text-align:center; background:#cfc;"
| 2011-09-23 || Win || align=left| Kim Jin Hyeok || RISE 83 || Tokyo, Japan || Decision (Unanimous)|| 3 || 3:00

|-  style="text-align:center; background:#cfc;"
| 2011-07-23 || Win || align=left| Hamza Essalih || RISE 80 || Tokyo, Japan || Decision (Majority) || 3 || 3:00

|-  style="text-align:center; background:#cfc;"
| 2011-02-27 || Win || align=left| Kan Itabashi || RISE 74 || Tokyo, Japan || Decision (Split) || 5 || 3:00
|-
! style=background:white colspan=9 |

|-  style="text-align:center; background:#cfc;"
| 2010-12-29 || Win || align=left| Yuji "RIOT" Nagado || RISE 73R || Tokyo, Japan || KO (Right High Kick) || 1 || 2:17

|-  style="text-align:center; background:#cfc;"
| 2010-10-03 || Win || align=left| Ponsin Kiatchangsing|| RISE 71 || Tokyo, Japan || KO (Right High Kick) || 2 || 2:19

|- align="center"  bgcolor="#FFBBBB"
| 2010-05-02 || Loss || align=left| Keiji Ozaki || K-1 WORLD MAX 2010 ～-63kg Japan Tournament 1st Round～ || Tokyo, Japan || Decision (Split) || 3 || 3:00

|-  style="text-align:center; background:#cfc;"
| 2010-03-27 || Win|| align=left| Takehiro Murahama || K-1 WORLD MAX 2010 ～-70kg Japan Tournament～ || Tokyo, Japan || TKO (Corner Stoppage)|| 2 || 1:49

|-  style="text-align:center; background:#cfc;"
| 2009-11-22 || Win || align=left| TURBφ || RISE 60 || Japan || Decision (Unanimous) || 3 || 3:00

|-  style="text-align:center; background:#cfc;"
| 2009-10-04 || Win || align=left| Makoto Kushima || RISE 59 || Japan || KO (Right Hook)|| 3 || 0:57

|- align="center"  bgcolor="#FFBBBB"
| 2009-05-13 || Loss || align=left| Tomohaki Suehiro || RISE 55 || Japan || Ext.R Decision (Unanimous) || 4 || 3:00

|-  style="text-align:center; background:#cfc;"
| 2009-03-29 || Win || align=left| Prazinho || RISE 53 || Japan || KO || 1 || 3:00

|-  style="text-align:center; background:#cfc;"
| 2008-11-30 || Win || align=left| Hideya Nazakasaki || RISE 51 || Japan || Decision || 3 || 3:00

|-  style="text-align:center; background:#cfc;"
| 2008-08-30 || Win || align=left| Masato Fuse || R.I.S.E.49 RISING ROOKIES CUP || Japan || KO (3 Knockdowns) || 2 || 2:13
|-
! style=background:white colspan=9 |

|-  style="text-align:center; background:#cfc;"
| 2008-07-04 || Win || align=left| Makoto Nakamura || RISE 48 THE KING OF GLADIATORs’08 || Japan || TKO (Doctor Stoppage) || 3 || 1:11

|-  style="text-align:center; background:#cfc;"
| 2008-04-27 || Win || align=left| Taiyou Takahira || RISE 45 || Japan || Decision (Extra round) || 4 || 3:00

|-  style="text-align:center; background:#cfc;"
| 2008-02-22 || Win || align=left| Akikusa Toshimitsu || RISE || Japan || KO || 1 || 2:40

|-  style="text-align:center; background:#cfc;"
| 2007-12-16 || Win || align=left| Daisuke Honma || RISE DEAD OR ALIVE TOURNAMENT’07 || Japan || Decision || 3 || 3:00

|-
| colspan=9 | Legend:

See also
 List of male kickboxers

References

Living people
1986 births
Japanese male kickboxers
Featherweight kickboxers
Sportspeople from Nagano Prefecture